Hapilyn Iro (born ) is a Solomon Islands female weightlifter, competing in the 69 kg category and representing Solomon Islands at international competitions. She competed at world championships, most recently at the 2011 World Weightlifting Championships.

Major results

References

1992 births
Living people
Solomon Islands female weightlifters
Place of birth missing (living people)
Weightlifters at the 2014 Commonwealth Games
Commonwealth Games competitors for the Solomon Islands